Craig Newitt (born 1984 or 1985) is an Australian jockey who rides mostly in Victoria. 

Newitt was born in Tasmania, the son of two jockeys. He began his career in 2000, and moved to Victoria to finish his apprenticeship with Lee Freedman. His first Group One winner was Perfect Promise in the 2006 C F Orr Stakes. As of mid-May 2022, he has ridden 2,140 winners, including 33 in Group One races. Five of his Group One wins were on Miss Andretti between May 2006 and March 2008. He also won four Group Ones on Lankan Rupee. He continues to ride in Tasmania, where he has won a record seven Devonport Cups.

Newitt and his partner Breaana Smith have four sons.

References

1980s births
Living people
Australian jockeys
Sportsmen from Tasmania